Ichte, in its upper course also called Steinaer Bach, is a river of Thuringia and Lower Saxony, Germany.

The Ichte springs east of the Oder Dam as Steinaer Bach in Lower Saxony. After the confluence of the Hellegrundbach, the river is called Ichte. The Ichte then crosses the boundary between Lower Saxony and Thuringia.

See also
List of rivers of Thuringia
List of rivers of Lower Saxony

References

Rivers of Thuringia
Rivers of Lower Saxony
Rivers of Germany